The Torité River is a river in Dominica.

See also
List of rivers of Dominica

References
 Map of Dominica
  GEOnet Names Server
 Water Resources Assessment of Dominica, Antigua and Barbuda, and St. Kitts and Nevis

Rivers of Dominica